Joe Flexer (March 23, 1933 – July 31, 2000) was a trade unionist and communist activist in Canada. Born in Brooklyn, Flexer was politicized in the mid-1940s through contacts with the American Communist Party in New York City. He left the United States, a Zionist, in 1950 at the age of 17 with the Habonim (now Habonim Dror) Zionist youth movement and immigrated to Israel where he lived in Kibbutz Urim.

During the early 1950s he witnessed what he viewed as human rights abuses of Palestinians in southern Israel by the Israeli authorities. In 1956, following his participation as a mechanic with the Israeli forces in the Sinai Campaign, he broke from Zionism and became active with the Israeli Communist Party. As a result, he was forced to leave Urim in 1958 and he moved with his family to the southern Israeli town of Beersheba.

In 1963 Flexer moved to Canada settling in Winnipeg, Manitoba where he became involved in the anti-war movement protesting the Vietnam War and participated in the removal of Dow Chemical from the University of Manitoba campus. In 1968 he, moved to Montreal. Following a brief stay in Israel in 1970, where he lived and worked on Kibbutz Gan-Shmuel, he moved back to Canada and settled in Toronto in 1970. There he joined the Waffle, a radical socialist tendency within the New Democratic Party, becoming its provincial organizer in Ontario. Moving leftward, he helped form the Red Circle, a Marxist tendency within the Waffle. When the Waffle was forced out of the NDP in 1972, Flexer and the Red Circle split with the Waffle, opposing its decision to leave the NDP, and tried to continue Marxist activities within the NDP.

Flexer and the Red Circle joined the Revolutionary Marxist Group in 1973 which, in turn, joined with other Trotskyist groups to form the Revolutionary Workers League in 1977. In 1973, Flexer, a diesel mechanic and machinist by trade, was hired by Carruthers, the main Caterpillar service centre and dealership in Southern Ontario. There he joined the United Auto Workers union local 112, and became a shop steward and then plant chairman for the union.

Flexer led a small industrial caucus within the RWL. He joined the exodus of Trotskyists that left the RWL in the early 1980s and focused instead on working within what had become the Canadian Auto Workers union.  He freelanced in the CAW's education department where he helped develop the union's political education program for workers and taught Marxist Economics in the CAW's Port Elgin, Ontario education centre. When asked what political party he belonged to, he'd joke he was a member of the "Joe Flexer Communist Party, we have a very small membership but a very lively internal discussion".

He joined the Communist Party of Canada while it was in crisis due to the dissolution of the Soviet Union and helped organize the split that saw Flexer and much of the CPC's leadership leave to form the Cecil-Ross Society.

Flexer opposed Bob Rae's NDP government following its introduction of the Social Contract that suspended collective bargaining contracts for public sector unions. In the 1995 Ontario election he ran as an "Independent Labour" candidate in Oakwood against NDP MPP Tony Rizzo and placed fourth out of seven candidates with 301 votes.

He subsequently joined Socialist Action, a Trotskyist group, and became a member of its editorial board. As Socialist Action practiced entryism, Flexer also joined the New Democratic Party which he had previously run against.

In 1998, Flexer helped form the NDP Socialist Caucus becoming its co-chair and authored its Manifesto for a Socialist Canada.

Flexer suffered from heart disease in the last years of his life. In 1994, he underwent a heart transplant. His new heart failed him after six years and he died in Toronto. He was buried at Bathurst Lawn Memorial Park in Toronto.

Sources 
 Joe Flexer 1933-2000 Socialist History Project

American communists
American emigrants to Israel
American expatriates in Israel
Israeli communists
Israeli activists
Canadian Trotskyists
Communist Party of Canada politicians
Canadian activists
People from Brooklyn
Jewish Canadian politicians
Israeli emigrants to Canada
Canadian people of American descent
20th-century American Jews
1933 births
2000 deaths
Candidates in Ontario provincial elections
Heart transplant recipients
Canadian trade unionists
Jewish trade unionists